Arthur Frank Burns (April 27, 1904 – June 26, 1987) was an American economist and diplomat who served as the 10th chairman of the Federal Reserve from 1970 to 1978. He previously chaired the Council of Economic Advisers under President Dwight D. Eisenhower from 1953 to 1956, and served as the first Counselor to the President under Richard Nixon from January to November 1969. He also taught and researched at Rutgers University, Columbia University, and the National Bureau of Economic Research.

President Nixon nominated him to succeed William McChesney Martin as Chairman of the Federal Reserve and later renominated him for another term. Burns was succeeded by G. William Miller when his second term expired. After leaving the Fed, President Ronald Reagan chose him to serve as Ambassador to West Germany in 1981, where he remained in office until 1985.

Early life 
Burns was born in Stanislau (now Ivano-Frankivsk), Austrian Poland (Galicia), a province of the Austro-Hungarian Empire, in 1904 to Polish-Jewish parents, Sarah Juran and Nathan Burnseig, who worked as a house painter. He showed aptitude early in his childhood, when he translated the Talmud into Polish and Russian by age six and debated socialism at age nine. In 1914, he immigrated to Bayonne, New Jersey, with his parents. He graduated from Bayonne High School.

At age 17, Burns enrolled in Columbia University on a scholarship offered by the university secretary. He worked in jobs ranging from postal clerk to shoe salesman during his time at Columbia as a student before earning his B.A. and M.A. in 1925, graduating Phi Beta Kappa.

Academic career

Rutgers University 
After college, he began teaching economics at Rutgers University in 1927, a role that he continued until 1944. Burns through his lectures became one of two professors, the other being Homer Jones, credited by Milton Friedman as a key influence for his decision to become an economist. Burns had convinced Friedman, Rutgers class of 1932, that modern economics could help end the Great Depression.

In 1930, he married Helen Bernstein, a teacher.

Burns pursued graduate studies at Columbia while continuing his lectures at Rutgers. As a doctoral student, he became  a protege of Wesley Clair Mitchell, a founder and the chief economics researcher of the National Bureau of Economic Research. In 1933, Burns joined the NBER under Mitchell's guidance and began a lifelong study of business cycles. He received his Ph.D. in economics from Columbia a year later.

In 1943 he was elected as a Fellow of the American Statistical Association.
In 1944, he left Rutgers and assumed the role of director of research at the NBER in 1945 following Mitchell's retirement.

Columbia University 
In 1945, Burns became a professor at Columbia University. In 1959, he received the John Bates Clark endowed chair. At Columbia, he blocked the acceptance of Murray Rothbard's thesis on the Panic of 1819, despite having known Rothbard since the latter was a child.

During his time at Columbia, Burns was elected a member of both the American Academy of Arts and Sciences and the American Philosophical Society.

National Bureau of Economic Research 
Beginning in 1933, the academic part of Burns's career focused on the measurement of business cycles, including questions such as the duration of economic expansions, and what economic variables rise during expansions and fall during recessions. In 1934, Burns wrote Production Trends in the United States Since 1870 his first major publication in the field.

Often, he collaborated with Wesley Clair Mitchell, whose research directorate role he assumed from 1945 to 1953.  In 1946, Burns and Mitchell published Measuring Business Cycles, which presented the characteristic NBER methods of analyzing business cycles. During his tenure, Burns began the academic tradition of determining recessions, a role continued by the NBER's business cycle dating committee. Today, the NBER is still considered authoritative in dating recessions.

In the late 1940s, Burns asked Milton Friedman, then a professor at the University of Chicago, to join the NBER as a researcher of the role of money in the business cycle. Burns's detailed macroeconomic analysis influenced Milton Friedman and Anna Schwartz's classic work A Monetary History of the United States, 1867–1960.

Public service

Counselor to the President
Burns was appointed as Counselor to the President when Richard Nixon took office in 1969. The newly created position held cabinet rank and was meant as a placeholder until Burns could be appointed as Chairman of the Federal Reserve. Burns advised Nixon on economic policy during his brief time in the White House.

As expected, Burns was appointed to replace the outgoing William McChesney Martin as Fed Chairman in November 1969 and resigned his post in the Nixon administration.

Federal Reserve Chairman 
Burns served as Fed Chairman from February 1970 until the end of January 1978. He has a reputation of having been overly influenced by political pressure in his monetary policy decisions during his time as Chairman and for supporting the policy, widely accepted in political and economic circles at the time, that Fed action should try to maintain an unemployment rate of around 4 percent.

While Vice President Richard M. Nixon was running for President in 1959–1960, the Fed – under Truman-appointed chairman William McChesney Martin, Jr. – was undertaking monetary tightening, increasing the cost of borrowing and reflected in a recession by April 1960.  In his book Six Crises, Nixon later blamed his defeat in 1960 in part on Fed policy and the resulting tight credit conditions and slow growth.  After finally winning the presidential election of 1968, Nixon named Burns to the Fed Chair in 1970 with instructions to ensure easy access to credit when Nixon was running for reelection in 1972.

Later, when Burns resisted, negative press about him was planted in newspapers and, under the threat of legislation to dilute the Fed's influence, Burns and other Governors succumbed. Burns' relationship with Nixon was often rocky. Reflecting in his diary about a 1971 meeting attended by himself, Nixon, Treasury Secretary John Connally, the Chairman of the Council of Economic Advisors, and the Director of the Bureau of the Budget, Burns wrote:

There was significant inflation during this period, which Nixon attempted to manage through wage and price controls while the Fed under Burns increased the money supply. Although Burns opposed Nixon's decision to close the "gold window," he "'assured the President that I would support his new program fully,' notwithstanding his reservations about the gold suspension." After the 1972 election, due in part to oil shocks from the 1973 oil crisis, price controls began to fail and by 1974, the inflation rate was 12.3 percent.

Burns thought the country was not willing to accept rates of unemployment in the range of six percent as a means of quelling inflation.  From the Board of Governors meeting minutes of November 1970, Burns believed that:

During Burns' tenure, the rate of change of the consumer price index rose from 6%/year in early 1970 to over 12%/year in late 1974 after the Arab Oil embargo, and eventually falling to under 7%/year from 1976 to the end of his tenure in January, 1978, with an annual average rate of consumer price inflation of approximately 9% during his term.  Negative economic events included multiple oil shocks (1973 and 1979) and heavy government deficits arising in part from the Vietnam War and Great Society government programs.

At the Watergate break-in of 1972, the burglars were found carrying $6300 of sequentially numbered $100 bills. The Fed lied to reporter Bob Woodward as to the source of the bills. Burns stonewalled Congressional investigations about them and issued a directive to all Fed offices prohibiting any discussion of the subject.

In 1976, Burns received the U.S. Senator John Heinz Award for Greatest Public Service by an Elected or Appointed Official, an award given out annually by Jefferson Awards.

American Enterprise Institute 
William Baroody, then president of the American Enterprise Institute, brought Burns to the economics think tank in 1978 after Burns left his position at the Federal Reserve. From the AEI, Burns continued to influence public policy.

Ambassador to West Germany 
Arthur Burns was appointed United States Ambassador to West Germany by President Ronald Reagan.  He served in Bonn from June 1981 to May 1985.

Death
He died on June 26, 1987, at Johns Hopkins Hospital in Baltimore, Maryland.

Criticism 
Conservative economist Bruce Bartlett gives Burns poor marks for his tenure as Fed chairman because the inflationary forces that began in 1970 took more than a decade to resolve.

In more recent years, the famous quote, "The ultimate purpose of an economy is to produce more consumer goods," has erroneously been attributed to Burns in popular culture. However, there is absolutely no evidence that Burns ever uttered this statement; to the contrary, he advocated–both in his speeches and his policies–for thrift and fiscal responsibility.

Selected works 
 Burns, Arthur Frank; Mitchell, Wesley C., Measuring Business Cycles,  National Bureau of Economic Research (Studies in Business Cycles), 1946
 Burns, Arthur Frank, Wesley Clair Mitchell: The Economic Scientist. New York: National Bureau of Economic Research, 1952
 Burns, Arthur Frank, The Frontiers of Economic Knowledge: Essays, Princeton University Press, 1954. Reprinted from a National Bureau of Economic Research publication.
 Burns, Arthur Frank, Prosperity Without Inflation, Buffalo, Smith, Keynes & Marshall; distributed by Doubleday, Garden City, N.Y., 1958
 Burns, Arthur Frank, et al., The Anguish of Central Banking, Per Jacobsson Foundation, 1979

See also
Economic Cycle Research Institute

Sources 
 
 Burns, Arthur F. Inside the Nixon Administration: The Secret Diary of Arthur Burns, 1969–1974 (University Press of Kansas, 2010); reviewed by Doug French, "Burns Diary Exposes the Myth of Fed Independence," Mises Institute.
 Burns, Arthur F. Reflections of an Economic Policy Maker: Speeches and Congressional Statements: 1969–1978 (AEI Studies no. 217; Washington: American Enterprise Inst., 1978); reviewed by Paul W. McCracken, "Reflections of an Economic Policy Maker: a Review Article" in Journal of Economic Literature 1980 18(2): 579–585. ISSN 0022-0515 Fulltext online at Jstor and Ebsco.
 Burns, Arthur F. "Progress Towards Economic Stability." American Economic Review 1960 50(1): 1–19.  Fulltext in Jstor and Ebsco. Abstract: Views economic growth, 1929–59; discusses corporate growth, government subsidies, increased consumer expenditures, rise in personal income, industrialization, and overall improvement in economic organization.
 Engelbourg, Saul. "The Council of Economic Advisers and the Recession of 1953–1954." Business History Review 1980 54(2): 192–214.  Fulltext in Jstor. Abstract: The 1953–54 recession was the first in which a Council of Economic Advisers (CEA) appointed by a Republican President, Dwight D. Eisenhower, recommended policy actions. Despite traditional Republican Party rhetoric, the CEA supported an activist contracyclical approach that helped to establish Keynesianism as a bipartisan economic policy for the nation. Especially important in formulating the CEA response to the recession – accelerating public works programs, easing credit, and reducing taxes – were Arthur F. Burns and Neil H. Jacoby.
 

 Throckmorton, H. Bruce. "The Moral Suasion of Arthur F. Burns: 1970–1977." Essays in Economic and Business History 1991 9: 111–121. .  Abstract: Reviews key words in Arthur F. Burns's testimony on various occasions before the Joint Economic Committee of Congress while he served as chairman of the Board of Governors of the Federal Reserve System, 1970–78. Correlates the key words with rates of inflation and interest rates to determine if there is a relationship between key words of testimony and selected economic variables.

Notes

External links 

 Papers of Arthur F. Burns, Dwight D. Eisenhower Presidential Library
 Arthur F. Burns Papers, 1911–2005 and undated, bulk 1940–1987, Rubenstein Library Duke University
 Statements and Speeches of Arthur F. Burns
Papers of Arthur Burns, Gerald R. Ford Presidential Library, selected documents cited in the Allan H. Meltzer book A History of the Federal Reserve.
 
 Collection of Arthur Burns's works.

1904 births
1987 deaths
20th-century American businesspeople
20th-century American diplomats
20th-century American economists
20th-century American Jews
Ambassadors of the United States to West Germany
American people of Polish-Jewish descent
Austro-Hungarian emigrants to the United States
Bayonne High School alumni
Carter administration personnel
Chairs of the Federal Reserve
Chairs of the United States Council of Economic Advisers
Columbia Business School alumni
Columbia College (New York) alumni
Columbia Graduate School of Arts and Sciences alumni
Columbia University alumni
Columbia University faculty
Eisenhower administration personnel
Fellows of the American Statistical Association
Fellows of the Econometric Society
Ford administration personnel
Grand Crosses with Star and Sash of the Order of Merit of the Federal Republic of Germany
Jews from Galicia (Eastern Europe)
Macroeconomists
National Bureau of Economic Research
Nixon administration cabinet members
Nixon administration personnel
People from the Kingdom of Galicia and Lodomeria
Presidents of the American Economic Association
Member of the Mont Pelerin Society
Members of the American Philosophical Society